St Matthew's Church (formerly Free Church and West Church) is a church in the Scottish city of Perth, Perth and Kinross. Of Church of Scotland denomination, it is located on Tay Street, overlooking the River Tay, just east of the city centre. Completed in November 1871, the work of John Honeyman, it is a Category B listed building.

In 1965, the four congregations of Wilson Church, Scott Street, West and Middle, and Bridgend Church were merged to become St Matthew's.

The church celebrated its 150th anniversary in November 2021.

Prominence

The church's prominent location, on the banks of the River Tay, has resulted in its being one of the primary image subjects in search engine returns for the city, mostly from the viewpoint of Queen's Bridge. It has also been the subject of several paintings, including that of Alexander McLauchlan.

See also

List of listed buildings in Perth, Scotland

References

External links
 
Transcript from the ceremony of the laying of the church's foundation stone – The Dundee Courier and Argus, 19 May 1870

Category B listed buildings in Perth and Kinross
Listed churches in Scotland
Matthew's, Saint
1871 establishments in Scotland
Listed buildings in Perth, Scotland
Church of Scotland churches in Scotland
19th-century Church of Scotland church buildings